Cassano delle Murge is a town and comune in the Metropolitan City of Bari, Apulia, southern Italy.

Origins of the name 
It probably derives from the Latin name Cassius with the addition of the suffix -anus.

According to others, the name refers to the ancient worship for Janus to whom a small temple was dedicated, that is Jani's house. From this derives the toponym of the town "Casa Jani"

Actually this derivation, proposed by the historian Nicola Alessandrelli, is rather doubtful, as "house" in Latin corresponds to domus.

An alternative hypothesis is that the name derives from the Cassia gens.

In the high imperial age the whole Puglia was object of centuriation by the Romans, so it could be Cassianum, that is property of the Cassia family.

From archeological excavations carried out, it seems that the cardo maximus (Via Sanges-Via Cavour axis) and the Decumanus Maximus (Via Gentile-Via Magg. Turitto axis) intersected in the current Piazzetta delle Quattro Colonne.

Moreover, Cassano, stands on a link road between the Traiana way and the Appian Way and it seems that the town was a rest station and a Camino dei cavalli.

Recently, a Romanic mosaic was discovered under the pavement of Miani Palace, which would prove the existence of a Roman villa, in compliance with the custom of building the most important buildings near the most important crossroads.

In Italy there are seven towns called Cassano, so in 1862 "delle Murge" was added to distinguish it from the others.

The specification refers to the well-known Apulian plateau.

History

Prehistoric Age 
Hundreds of stone artifacts, paintings, various objects found in the caves around the town tell us about prehistoric settlements.

The recent discovery of a menhir, dating back to 2500–2000 BC., confirms the antiquity of the human presence in these districts.

Roman Age 
The origins of Cassano seem to date back to the Roman Age, as confirmed by many archaeological finding, such as the recent discovery of a precious 5th century mosaic floor.

Also in late antiquity, in a point of the territory called "Lake of Battaglia" a clash relating to the Greek-Gothic War took place between the army of the Byzantine Empire and the troops of the Gothic Totila, during which it would have distinguished itself, for courage, a Cassanese woman dressed as a warrior, distinguished herself, for courage and heroism.

To worship her memory, her companions erected a monument to her with a pile of stones, still known today as "Specchia di femina morta".

Due to the typical karstic conformation of the area, there are a lot of grottos. The biggest is located about 3 Km from the urban built up area, the grotto called "di Cristo", was discovered in the 17th century. Two kilometers to the east we find the grave of "Pasciullo", 180 meters deep and still to be explored. Three kilometers to the south-east, a source called "Pozzo di Conetto" gushes.

Historical investigations have ascertained the existence of a temple dedicated to Janus in the place where the church of SS. Crucifix is.

Physical geography

Weather 
The weather of Cassano delle Murge is a cool Mediterranean one, with not very cold winters and hot and dry summers. Rainfall is around 700 mm / year, therefore generally abundant in winter, autumn and spring and rare in summer, from July to September, although there are also thunderstorms in the afternoon. Snow falls almost exclusively in January and February, during the cold air waves from the Balkans or from the North Europe. In winter the prevailing wind is the sirocco or libeccio.

Monuments and Places of interest

Religious architectures 
 Convento di Maria Santissima degli Angeli
 Chiesa di Santa Maria Assunta (chiesa matrice – sede parrocchiale)
 Chiesa della Madonna delle Grazie (sede parrocchiale)
 Chiesa del Santissimo Crocifisso
 Chiesa di San Giuseppe
 Chiesa di San Nicola
 Chiesa di San Rocco
 Cappella dell'Immacolata
 Cappella della Madonna di Costantinopoli

Civil architectures 
 Miani Palace

Society

Demographic evolution 
Inhabitants registered by Istituto Nazionale di Statistica.

Ethnicities and foreign minorities 
The foreigners living in Cassano delle Murge are 553. In 2013, the most numerous groups were:
 Albania, 402
 Romania, 122

Culture

Cinema 
Cassano delle Murge has been transformed into a film set on several occasion.

Between 1930 and 1931, the milanese director Mauri made one of the last silent movies of the Italian cinema, but one of the first silent movies turned in Apulia. Idillio infranto – Film folkloristico pugliese, this title had the female Mantovani protagonist Mantovani and a cast amateur actors, with Michele Silecchia and Filippo Ilbello. Shootings were carried out by the photographer Perugini and some scenes were filmed in the countryside of the Murgia, near Cassano delle Murge. The movie, in black and white, lasts 53 minutes.

Another movie is Three brothers (1981), a film by Francesco Rosi with Michele Placido, Philippe Noiret, Vittorio Mezzogiorno, Charles Vanel.

In 2004 the Apulian director Sergio Rubini filmed Love Returns, with Margherita Buy and Mariangela Melato.

Art 
In 2016 the Apulia Land art Festival was held by Massimo Nardi. Over 20 countries in the world, took part, almost 100 artists asked to take part, and 11 of them were invited for the final competition. Embassies of every culture, the artists of the recent edition of ALAF were characterized by extremely different, heterogeneous and, at the same time, complementary curricula. Harvard, Cambridge, University College of London, IED, Academy of Bulgaria and many others, are the institutions represented, making a urbi et orbi of art in the silvanico Bosco di Mesola, which, as expected by the festival's statements, becomes, for a week, one of the protagonists of the Italian contemporary art scenes.

Economy

Handicraft 
Among the most traditional and renowned activities there are handicrafts, which are distinguished by the production of wicker and Juncus, used for the creation of furniture.

List of mayors 
Below there is a table relating to the successive administrations in this town.

Sport 
 ASD Atletico Cassano – Futsal amateur football club, member of the serie A2 championship.
 ASD Volley Cassano – Amateur volleyball club member of the youth sector and of the serie D championship.
 ASD Cassano skating – Amateur roller skating society that annually participates in regional and national championships.

Notable people 
Antonio Quatraro, European Commission official.
Domenico Turitto, Italian officer during the First Italo-Ethiopian War

References 

Cities and towns in Apulia